Love   (2008) is a Bengali film by Indian director Riingo Banerjee, and based upon Love Story by Erich Segal.

Plot
The film is about two young people in love, who battle the odds, live through the tough times with a smile and who take a vow to never part until death. Jisshu plays Rahul Ray, a rich Hindu boy and management student, who falls in love with Ria Fernandez, a poor Christian music student, played by Koel Mallick.

Cast
Jisshu Sengupta as Rahul Ray
Koel Mallick as Ria Fernandez
 Krishnokishore Mukherjee
 Chaitali Dasgupta
 George Baker

Soundtrack

References

External links
ilovekolkata.in review of film
Calcutta Tube - Online Bengali Movies
The Telegraph reviews
calonline.com
Telegraphindia.com: Story 1
Telegraphindia.com: Story 2
gomlo.in interview with director Riingo
Telegraphindia.com Story 3
Telegraphindia Story 4
Shoma A. Chatterji Screenindia.com "LOVE: A social vacuum (sic)"

2008 films
Bengali-language Indian films
2000s Bengali-language films
Films directed by Riingo Banerjee